The Avtek 400A was an American prototype turboprop-powered business aircraft developed in the early 1980s. It was of unusual and distinctive configuration: a low-wing monoplane with two pusher engines mounted above the wings, and a large canard mounted atop the forward fuselage.  The aircraft's sleek, futuristic design earned it a guest appearance on the Airwolf TV series as the X-400, the plane used by the villain Lou Stappleford in the episode Eagles.

The Avtek's structure made extensive use of advanced composite materials throughout.

In 1998, Avtek declared bankruptcy without the prototype having completed the testing required for US FAA type certification. The company's assets were purchased by AvtekAir, who  planned to revive the project under the designation AvtekAir 9000T.

Specifications (Avtek 400A pre-production prototype)

See also

References

Further reading

External links
 AvtekAir company website
 luftfahrt-archiv.de
 aerofiles.com

400
Abandoned civil aircraft projects of the United States
1980s United States business aircraft
Canard aircraft
Low-wing aircraft
Twin-engined pusher aircraft
Twin-engined turboprop aircraft
Aircraft first flown in 1984